Moribund Oblivion is a Turkish black metal band from Istanbul, formed by vocalist Bahadır Uludağlar in 1999. The current line-up consists of Bahadir Uludaglar, Serdal Semen, and Fatih Kanık, who joined the band in August 2015.

Career 
The Like a Falling Haze EP was released in 2002 to promote their first studio album, Khanjar, released on 6 January 2004. That same day, Moribund Oblivion performed in support of the Portuguese metal band Moonspell. The band also conducted the first black metal tour of Turkey to promote the album, appearing in Istanbul, Ankara, Izmir, Eskişehir and Bursa. At the end of the tour, the group performed at the Barisarock and Rock The Nations festivals, and played a gig with Greek black metal band Rotting Christ in Istanbul. The band released a music video for the song, "Ruins of Kara-Shehr", from the Khanjar album, which aired on Turkish channels TRT and Dream TV.

Moribund Oblivion signed with Istanbul record label Atlantis Music for their second album Machine Brain, released in 2006.

In 2008, the band appeared in two Turkish newspapers: Star (July 2008) and Hurriyet (September 2008), as well as headlining the Tbilisi Metal Fest in Georgia and performing at the Interregnum Fest in Rostock, Germany.

Discography
 Like a Falling Haze EP (2002)
 Khanjar (2004)
 Machine Brain (2006)
 Time to Face (2007)
 K.I.N. (2008)
 Izdırap EP (2010)
 Manevi (2013)
 Turk (2014)
 False Consolation (2017)
 Endless (2020)

Turkish black metal musical groups
Musical groups established in 1999
Musical groups from Istanbul
1999 establishments in Turkey